Lincoln County Airport may refer to:

 Lincoln County Airport in Panaca, Nevada, United States (FAA: 1L1)
 Lincolnton-Lincoln County Regional Airport in Lincolnton, North Carolina, United States (FAA: IPJ)
 Brookhaven-Lincoln County Airport in Brookhaven, Mississippi, United States (FAA: 1R7)
 Marv Skie-Lincoln County Airport in Tea, South Dakota, United States (FAA: Y14)

See also
 Lincoln Airport (disambiguation)
 Lincoln Municipal Airport (disambiguation)
 Lincoln Regional Airport (disambiguation)